Adja-Ouèrè  is a town, arrondissement, and commune in the Plateau Department of south-eastern Benin. The commune covers an area of 550 square kilometres and as of 2013 had a population of 115,953 people.

References

Communes of Benin
Arrondissements of Benin
Populated places in the Plateau Department